was an early Japanese animation director whose work includes the first examples of commercial production of anime. Kitayama was referred to as one of the fathers of anime by Yoshirō Irie, a researcher at Japan's National Film Center.

Works
Battle of a Monkey and a Crab (1917)
Yume no jidōsha (1917)
Neko to nezumi (1917)
Itazura posuto (1917)
Hanasaka-jiji (1917)
Chokin no susume (1917)
(Otogibanashi–) Bunbuku chagama (1917)
Shitakire suzume (1917)
Kachikachiyama (1917)
Chiri mo tsumoreba yama to naru (1917)
Urashima Tarō (1918)
Momotarō
Tarou no Banpei Senkoutei no Maki

References

1945 deaths
Anime directors
1888 births
Articles containing video clips